A wooden spoon is an award that is given to an individual or team that has come last in a competition. Examples range from the academic to sporting and more frivolous events. The term is of British origin and has spread to other English-speaking countries. In most cases it is simply a colloquial term for coming last – there is no actual award given.

Wooden spoon at the University of Cambridge 
The wooden spoon was presented originally at the University of Cambridge as a kind of booby prize awarded by the students to the person who achieved the lowest exam marks but still earned a third-class degree (a junior optime) in the Mathematical Tripos. The term "wooden spoon" or simply "the spoon" was also applied to the recipient, and the prize became quite notorious:

The spoons themselves, actually made of wood, grew larger, and in latter years measured up to five feet long. By tradition, they were dangled in a teasing way from the upstairs balcony in the Senate House, in front of the recipient as he came before the Vice-Chancellor to receive his degree, at least until 1875 when the practice was specifically banned by the university.

The lowest placed students earning a second-class (senior optime) or first-class degree (wrangler) were sometimes known as the "silver spoon" and "golden spoon" respectively. In contrast, the highest-scoring male student was named the "senior wrangler". Students unfortunate enough to place below the wooden spoon, by achieving only an Ordinary degree, were given a variety of names depending on their number. In the 1860s about three-quarters of the roughly 400 candidates did not score enough to be awarded honours, and were known as  poll men.

The custom dates back at least to the late 18th century, being recorded in 1803, and continued until 1909. From 1910 onwards the results have been given in alphabetical rather than score order, and so it is now impossible to tell who has come last, unless there is only one person in the lowest class.

Last award

The last wooden spoon was awarded to Cuthbert Lempriere Holthouse, an oarsman of the Lady Margaret Boat Club of St John's College, Cambridge, in 1909 at the graduation ceremony in the university's Senate House. The handle is shaped like an oar and inscribed with an epigram in Greek which may be translated as follows:

In Honours Mathematical,
This is the very last of all
The Wooden Spoons which you see here;
O you who see it, shed a tear.

Alternatively:
This wooden object is the last souvenir of the competitive examinations in mathematics. Look upon it, and weep.

The last spoon to be awarded is now in the possession of St. John's College, with an earlier version being kept at the Selwyn College Library. From 8 June 2009 to 26 June 2009, St. John's College held an exhibition of the five surviving wooden spoons in College hands, from St. John's (the last one, dating from 1909), Selwyn's (1906), Emmanuel's (1889) and Corpus Christi's (1895 and 1907) in its library to mark the centenary of the "awarding" of the last spoon of all. There are five known wooden spoons in private hands.

In sport

Rugby union 
In rugby union's Six Nations Championship, the wooden spoon is a metaphorical award won by the team finishing in last place, or alternatively by a team that loses all its games. In 1894, the South Wales Daily Post remarked that within the Home Nations Championships the Ireland-Wales match has been to decide which team should be recipient of the ignominious Wooden Spoon.

Australian and New Zealand sports 

The term is commonly used in Australian and New Zealand sporting competitions, most notably in the major Australian rules, soccer, rugby league and rugby union leagues (such as the AFL, the A-League, NRL, Super Rugby and ITM Cup) and refers to the club positioned last on the league table at the end of the season.

VFL/AFL wooden spoons

National Rugby League

Big Bash League (cricket)

Suncorp Super Netball 
In the 2017 and 2018 Suncorp Super Netball seasons, the Adelaide Thunderbirds claimed the wooden spoon. In the latter year, they lost all fourteen of their regular season matches, resulting in Dan Ryan being sacked as the club's coach.

The Queensland Firebirds, Collingwood Magpies and Melbourne Vixens have won the past three wooden spoons, with the Vixens the most recent recipient of the award.

Major League Soccer

In United States' men's Major League Soccer, the last place team in the overall standings is generally considered as the "wooden spoon champion".  However, unlike other Wooden Spoon awards, there is a physical "trophy" for the award. Before the start of the 2016 MLS season, the Independent Supporters Council decided to create an actual official "trophy" for the lowest place team in the league, as a complement to the Supporters' Shield which the ISC also manages. The trophy is passed to the "winning" team at the annual ISC Conference, and the holders of the Spoon must possess the spoon for the entire following season. At the end of the year, every group awarded the Wooden Spoon are allowed to do what they will with the trophy. Chicago Fire FC was the "winner" of the inaugural 2015 wooden spoon trophy and their supporters had the responsibility of creating the first spoon. The award was christened the Andrew Hauptman Memorial Wooden Spoon by Chicago Fire FC supporters as a dig against the team's owner, Andrew Hauptman (2007–2019).

Beginning with the 2017 MLS season, the wooden spoon was renamed the Anthony Precourt Memorial Wooden Spoon, after the then-owner of the Columbus Crew, who at the time was attempting to move the franchise to Austin.

While the San Jose Earthquakes currently have the most wooden spoon "wins" overall (1997, 2000, 2008 and 2018), Chicago Fire FC holds the record for the most wooden spoons since it became an actual trophy, "winning" the award in both 2015 and 2016. This was also the only time since the award's physical creation that a club has earned this title two seasons in a row.

The wooden spoon was not officially awarded following the 2020 season, as the ISC board "felt it was inappropriate to offer such a distinction for shortened and geographically-limited seasons". FC Cincinnati would have been the recipient of the 2020 Wooden Spoon had it been awarded, and as the winner again in 2021, they effectively, but unofficially, repeated twice. The current holders are D.C. United (2022).

Canadian Premier League 
The Canadian Premier League has a fan made trophy, going to the team that finishes with the fewest points at the end of the regular season. The most recent recipient are FC Edmonton as of the 2022 season.

Oxford and Cambridge rowing 
In the Cambridge and Oxford bumps races, a crew who get bumped each day (thus moving down four places) are awarded spoons. This is probably related to the use of wooden spoons as a booby prize in the University of Cambridge Mathematical Tripos.

Tennis
A wooden spoon, also known as the "anti-slam", is sometimes spoken about in tennis. It is described as the worst possible outcome in a tournament, won by the player who is defeated in the first round by a player who is defeated in the second round, who is defeated in the third round and so forth, until the final of the tournament.

Some notable Grand Slam "wooden spooners" include, among others, John McEnroe (1978 Wimbledon Championships), Katerina Maleeva (1985 US Open), Nathalie Tauziat (1989 French Open), Manuela Maleeva-Fragnière (1990 Wimbledon Championships), Richard Krajicek (1994 Wimbledon Championships), Goran Ivanišević (1995 Australian Open), Mary Pierce (2002 Australian Open), Marat Safin (2004 US Open), Caroline Wozniacki (2007 French Open), Ana Ivanovic (2010 Wimbledon Championships), Karolína Plíšková (2015 US Open), Rafael Nadal (2016 Australian Open), Jelena Janković (2016 French Open), Naomi Osaka (2017 French Open), Stefanos Tsitsipas (2018 Australian Open), and Jeļena Ostapenko (2018 French Open - she was the defending champion, having won in 2017). Recently, Felix Auger Aliassime achieved it at the (2022 Wimbledon Championships) and Simona Halep at the 2022 US Open (tennis).

Greg Rusedski (1994 and 1995 US Open, 2006 Wimbledon Championships), Nicolás Lapentti (1996 French Open, 1997 and 2009 Wimbledon Championships) and Julien Benneteau (2014 and 2016 US Open, 2016 French Open) have claimed three wooden spoons throughout their career.

See also 
 County Championship Wooden Spoons
 Lanterne rouge – the last finisher in a cycling race
 Wooden Spoon Society
 Nul points

References

External links 
 Japanese Students at Cambridge University in the Meiji Era, 1868–1912: Pioneers for the Modernization of Japan , by Noboru Koyama, translated by Ian Ruxton, (Lulu Press, September 2004). This book contains detailed information regarding the Cambridge wooden spoon.

Ironic and humorous awards
Awards and prizes of the University of Cambridge
Culture of the University of Cambridge
Rugby union trophies and awards
Award items
Association football culture
Australian rules football culture
Cricket culture
Gaelic games culture
Rugby football culture
Tennis culture
Spoons